Nawabzada Abdul Ghafoor Khan Hoti (1923–1998) was a former governor  of the Khyber-Pakhtunkhwa (known as NWFP at the time) province of Pakistan. Belonging to Mardan, he was the son of Nawab Akbar Khan Hoti  and father of Inspector General of KPK Police Nawabzada Muhammad Akbar Khan Hoti.

He was one of the rare politicians who had said that he would resign from his office, if his son was proven guilty by a court in the United States. He later resigned as promised.

References

1923 births
1998 deaths
Governors of Khyber Pakhtunkhwa
Government of Pakistan
Muhammad Zia-ul-Haq
1980s in Pakistan
Minister of Railways (Pakistan)